Rear Admiral Robert P. Stevens,  (born 14 March 1948) is a former Royal Navy officer who served as Commander Operations and Rear Admiral, Submarines.

Naval career
Educated at Britannia Royal Naval College and Manchester Business School, Stevens joined the Royal Navy in September 1966 and was appointed Commanding Officer of the submarine  in 1979 and of the submarine  in 1985. He went on to be assistant director of Strategic Systems at the Ministry of Defence in 1989 and Commanding Officer of the frigate  as well as Captain of the 7th Frigate Squadron in 1992. After that he became Director Joint Warfare at the Ministry of Defence in 1994, Commander Operations and Rear Admiral, Submarines in 1998 and Chief of Staff to the Commander of Naval Forces South in 2002 before retiring in 2005.

Retirement
In retirement Stevens became Chief Executive of the British Marine Federation.

References

1948 births
Companions of the Order of the Bath
Living people
Royal Navy rear admirals